The 1870 Connecticut gubernatorial election was held on April 4, 1870. It was the third consecutive contest between the same two major party nominees. Former governor and Democratic nominee James E. English defeated incumbent governor and Republican nominee Marshall Jewell with 50.48% of the vote.

General election

Candidates
Major party candidates

James E. English, Democratic
Marshall Jewell, Republican

Results

References

1870
Connecticut
Gubernatorial